Neacerea minutum is a moth in the subfamily Arctiinae. It was described by Heinrich Benno Möschler in 1878. It is found in Venezuela, Suriname and Bolivia.

References

Moths described in 1878
Arctiinae